George Portelance (2 February 1931 – 14 September 1952) was a Canadian breaststroke and freestyle swimmer. He competed in two events at the 1952 Summer Olympics. He died by drowning in a boating accident.

References

External links
 

1931 births
1952 deaths
Canadian male breaststroke swimmers
Canadian male freestyle swimmers
Commonwealth Games competitors for Canada
Swimmers at the 1950 British Empire Games
Olympic swimmers of Canada
Swimmers at the 1952 Summer Olympics
Deaths by drowning in Canada
Accidental deaths in British Columbia
Place of birth missing